Tricorn Mountain is a mountain, 3,475 m, standing 4 nautical miles (7 km) east of Graphite Peak, about midway between the heads of Falkenhof and Leigh Hunt Glaciers. Named by the New Zealand Geological Survey Antarctic Expedition (NZGSAE) (1961–62) because of its resemblance to an admiral's tricorn hat.

Mountains of the Ross Dependency
Dufek Coast